This is a list of Scottish National Party MPs. It includes all Members of Parliament elected to the House of Commons representing the Scottish National Party since the party's formation. Members of the Scottish Parliament or the European Parliament are not listed as they are separate entities.

Current Members of Parliament are listed in bold.

List of MPs

Graphical representation

See also
 Scottish National Party
 List of MPs for constituencies in Scotland (2005–2010)
 List of MPs for constituencies in Scotland (2010–2015)
 List of MPs for constituencies in Scotland (2015–2017)
 List of MPs for constituencies in Scotland (2017–2019)
 List of Scottish National Party MPs (2005–2010)
 List of Scottish National Party MPs (2010–2015)

References

Scottish National Party MPs
Scottish National Party MPs